Bob Alcivar (born July 8, 1938, in Chicago, Illinois) is an American music producer, composer, conductor and keyboard player. He is the father of rock keyboard player Jim Alcivar (Montrose,  Gamma).

Discography

Film
Butterflies Are Free (1972)
The Crazy World of Julius Vrooder (1974)
Olly Olly Oxen Free (1978)
One From the Heart (1982)
The Best Little Whorehouse in Texas (arranger, 1982)
Hysterical (1983)
That Secret Sunday (TV) (1986)
Blind Witness (TV) (1999)
Naked Lie [TV] (1989)
Roxanne: The Prize Pulitzer [TV] (1989)
Sparks: The Price of Passion [TV] (1990)
Deadly Medicine [TV] (1991)

External links
[ allmusic Biography]
Film Reference Biography

1938 births
Living people
Musicians from Chicago
20th-century American keyboardists
Record producers from Illinois
The New Christy Minstrels members